Since the year 1929, the Liberal Party  period began. It lasted 16 years and had to fight the global economic crisis. Also, during this period, there was great controversy bipartisan, creating many internal conflicts. One of the major problems in the crisis was the dependency of Colombia in the U.S for the purchasing of coffee, which was the backbone of its economy.

The economic crisis in Colombia during the period of 1928 through 1933 was a devastating result of the previous years of prosperity based on high amounts of international loans and credits, high prices in exporting coffee, and a confident country that generated investment and cash flow. The same way Colombia prospered thanks to the US, it went down parallel to it in their time of crisis. The New York stock market collapsed, and the confidence within the country was low and protective. The investment stopped, as well as the loans, and Colombia was directly affected by that situation.  There was a constant decrease in the exporting potential product of Colombia, coffee, as well as a cut in the international loans and investment. Eventually, the crisis in the U.S.A. generated a cut in urban employment within Colombia, diminished internal market, and other problematic social and economic situations.

From the year 1933 to the year 1939, Colombia began to see a significant change in the country's industries, leaving behind the problems of urbanization in the twenties. Therefore, there was also an extensive agricultural development, strengthening the development of the economy and expansion of agriculture and livestock. During this period, coffee exports were very high. Coffee farmers managed to expand their crops; with the help of politics, they also tried promoting agriculture with the help of the “Consejo Nacional de Agricultura.”

Economic crisis

One of the main reasons for developing an economic crisis is when a world power country enters into the crisis, eventually, all countries get affected. Basically, a crisis leads a nation to debt and economic stagnation. Furthermore, it is ultimately influenced by factors such as culture, climate, previous development, political order, and internal and external social conflicts. In other words, there is a great deal of ingredients mixture needed for an economic crisis to come across.

First of all, to analyze an economic crisis, we need to know the symptoms of a healthy economy. There should be a progressive increase in sustainable growth on behalf of the government, the economy, and society as a whole. Something crucial for the country is the trade balance, which should mediate imports with exports. Also, the currency has to be revalued in order to have controlled inflation within all the areas. The government also has to be very careful in the amount of money that runs among the pockets of the people because that is what determines product prices and inflation. Unemployment rates also have to be no more than a digit to be considered a country with healthy economic symptoms concerning all the population, not a few favored. Now knowing the symptoms of a healthy economy, we can take into account what an economic crisis is and how it becomes global.

When problems are created on different bases, the economy becomes fragile and that is when the economic crisis occurs. This is given to other things that make development stagnates. In this period, exports fall, affecting the trade balance like a cycle. If a country's export is not enough, it will affect the rest of the countries, including its imports. There comes the point where it fails to defend the currency, and when that happens, its value falls, and people only think about getting rid of it to buy other. There is also the big problem of excess in the credit banking system, creating a situation in where the bank is not paying people and increases poverty.

The economic crisis is something that affects the whole world. There are clearly more developed countries, and the impact is equally different. In conclusion, the crisis occurs because panic is formed, and then a country loses confidence. This may cause stagnation in production and investment, leading the country to slow development. Because of the stagnation, unemployment grows, increasing human poverty.

Economic crisis 1928–1933

From 1922 to 1928, the two main factors that took over and increased Colombia's economy were the rise in external coffee prices (the main exportation product) and a massive increase in the international credits to the public and the bank system. An incredible amount of money was flowing within the country, with prosperity yet to be paid. Therefore, the economic success was not internally based and sustained; divergently, the economy was holding on to the United States credits and investment. That was the mistake, and that was the cause of the future crisis.

1928 significantly reduced external credit, generating a constant decline in the domestic bank credits and a holdback of Bogota and Medellin stock markets. Throughout 1929 the international coffee prices continued declining abruptly in addition to the New York stock market, and eventually, the first manifestations of urban unemployment boost generated an immediate internal market crisis. From that moment on till 1932, deflection resulted from the international price reduction of Colombian exporting products. It was only until 1932 that the rise in gold production compensated the external debt as well as created commercial balance, ultimately preventing the continuous loss in reserves. 
            
After Colombia was able to defend its currency, it was in search of a new economic politic. This was based on three pillars; fiscal, monetary, and costumes or external commerce. The problem was that free trade was established, and the lack of government intervention in the economy was induced. International imports weren't charged as much taxes supposedly to pay off the increase of living expenses, this didn't generate any positive results, and by 1931 a protectionist economy reestablished to reanimate the public investment. Colombia found itself within the countries that had to surrender to their exchange freedom and abandon the gold reserves to devalue their currency against gold and dollars. In the long run, it was a reaction to the collapse of international reserves. 
            
Parallel to the causes of the economic crisis in Colombia, the presidents in charge of the time (Abadia Mendez and Olaya Herrera) hastily reduced the public investment programs, causing a decline in the previous infrastructure privileged circumstances. This ultimately affected public employment and finances.

It was only until 1933 that the government gave a tremendous tip to its economic matters. It focused more on recuperating and reanimating the local product market, returned to the coffee exportation as a main economic sustains, and finally emphasized the improvements in domestic credits. The two main sections that favored the new economic measures were agricultural and industrial. Basically, because the loads of people who moved to the cities in search of work went back to the rural areas to work on agriculture which was productively exported again. Also, the industrial sector was favored due to the substitution of importation products by Colombian goods. These were the actions that Colombia took in order to take control over the economy once again and recuperate after five years of crisis.

Liberal republic

The Colombian government came from a long period of being conservative until the year 1930. This year in the elections, the liberal party started to take control. A period of social, political, and economic controversy was about to begin. The growing economic crisis and the way the conservative government handled the country's problems made them lose many followers, therefore losing their next elections. The most noticeable and immediate change was the sudden deterioration of the country's public order. Colombia also suffered a period of violence, not only with the internal conflicts but also with other countries. The violent issues and the global economic crisis were what were shouting for a new regimen.

The United States was not only providing investment; it was also producing internal violence. One example is how United Fruit Company could manipulate the government and reach what they wanted no matter the cost. It started when the company complains to the government that the workers were refusing to do their jobs because they were on strike. The government ordered the military to go to where they were and threaten the workers they would shoot if they didn't work. The workers refused to work, and there was when the military killed approximately 3000. Another violence problem in Colombia during the liberal party period was how the guerrilla groups started to form. This was created because the liberals were protecting themselves from the conservatives; this was a bipartisan violent problem.

When the liberals took over the government, one of Colombia's major problems was that they hadn't been in control for almost half a century. Part of the problem was that the liberals still accused the conservatives of things that were already left in the past and weren't relevant in the present.  This was a real big issue because many ideas and situations had already changed or disappeared with the conservative government. A fact worth mentioning, the loyalty of liberalism ideas wasn't based on what each person believes, but it was more an obligation that came from many years back, in other words, inherited hatred. Even though these problems did affect the relationship between these two parties, the government included some conservative members in the cabinet to make the transition easier. This would make the overall government ideas liberals but would also have some conservative influences.

The first liberal president during this period was Enrique Olaya Herrera. He took measures over how to handle the economic crisis, one of the measures he took was devaluing the currency to make the international exports more competitive and stimulate the industry. Something Olaya Herrera decided was essential to get over the crisis was making even stronger the relation between Colombia and U.S.A, so there was a chance that their vast resources would help resist the depression. Olaya also sustained the external debt, not letting it get out of control. He also gave importance to the workers and women. He made a law that the working day could not be more than eight hours and the legal right to organize unions. For the women, Olaya gave them the legal rights to own their own properties. In the girls´ schools, he said that they could have high school; that before was forbidden.

President Alfonso Lopez Pumarejo led the second liberal government. Many situations in his presidency were influenced by the New Deal and much idealism from Franklin D. Roosevelt. Most of the time, he dedicated himself to solving social bipartisan issues. Lopez called this “Revolucion en Marcha,” or revolution underway. Part of this process was helping the poor to participate in the system's benefit. This would also make the parties be more pacific and not use violence as a solution. One of the measures he took was making a new agrarian reform. This consisted of giving the peasants in non-legal land legal land to work on them. Lopez's administration was recognized for being the protector of the working class. He created something significant that was the CTC or the Colombian Worker Confederation. Lopez also increased public spending in public education and rural roads. He finished his presidency by making various changes to the constitution. He said that the started would have more power over economic issues, eliminating the article that said that public education had to agree with catholic religion; finally, he eliminated the literacy requirements to vote. In conclusion, Lopez's main contribution was making Colombia face for the first time its social issues.

Economy 1930–1945
It was until 1930 that Colombia's political government was steady and managed to grow economically.  Since the beginning of the century, new routes have developed, especially those of coffee.  The crop production was so good that its consumption was larger each time, bringing money invested in new oil companies and product consumption.  In 1930, when the Liberal party was able to retake power, new reform started to come up, and slowly the economy went down.

The economy in Colombia around World War II was divided into two extensive periods: from 1930 to 1939, in which the country experienced a tremendous increase and a new social transformation. 1939–1945, the economy was stagnant, and at the same time, the social transformation was not progressing at all. Although some countries around the world had trouble coming back from the crisis, Colombia was one of the few that had a swift and sustainable recovery in order to develop its agricultural sector, coffee production, and oil exploitations.

If we look at the economy from 1933 to 1939, we will see an extensive duplication in industrial production, growing by almost 11% annually; which no other country could accomplish. Although the increase was spectacular, we had to consider what the CEPAL organization said: “if we have a good growing rhythm, we need to think about the low initial level, which can cause future plans”.

The investor ignored the organization's fundamental fact, which created new textile, shoes, and expanding food companies. By 1939 all of these developed a considerable increase in the domestic demand and nearly 2,805 manufacturing companies led to low import demand.  Using these as a method wasn't as good as expected since other countries could see this as a closing trade action.

Economy 1946–1958

Previous to 1946, there was a tremendous break down in the international and national economy due to World War II. The income per capita was lower than average, and export and import activities were more difficult than before. Colombia reacted with an “emergency economy” by intervening in the coffee industry by coordinating and controlling transportation by organizing external commerce and strengthening importation regulation system. Until 1946, Colombia didn't focus on creating more reforms but on recuperating from the War and boosting the economy. 
	
The fastest increase in economic activity was during 1946 through 1953, where the country changed its economic structure, and the international situation was healthier. Eventually, the investment amplified noticeably as a result of the best conditions of external payments. The industry structure was diversifying due to the accelerating industry and the fast process of urbanization, which created a tremendous internal demand in cooperation with the protectionist substitution of imports. Even though all the economic sectors were increasing their production rates, the industry had the most representing statistics of development and modernization. In eight years, the industry duplicated its production directly because many of the rural population moved to the cities and linked. By creating new companies en developing many factories the innovation was focused on intermediary goods and capital, creating the quickest absorption rates of jobs among the industry directly. This phenomenon was present in Colombia and worldwide, where the most dynamic and increasing sector of the economy is the industry. Colombia's economy is completely linked to external financing plus the income from exportation products. 
	
Although the industry was the sector with the most representative lift up in Colombia from 1946 to 1958, the agriculture sector had a boost. A modernization in production was the key to high productivity. Three main factors were involved; the increasingly high demand for industrial raw material, the government stimulus, and the available international resources. To protect the agricultural sector from external competition from imported products, the government established high taxation, motivating internal production. The government generated a positive stimulus by introducing machinery and proper equipment, fertilizers, insecticides, credit, and infrastructure investment. As many industrial raw material crops were taking over the fertile and plain lands, the cattle were displaced and eventually diminished productivity. 
	
Even though Colombia demonstrates a healthier economy from 1946 through 1958, the country wasn't that well in the popular sections. Life conditions during this period are far from being considered acceptable. More than half of the employed population lives barely above subsistence level due to the sudden increase in urban areas. Not all agricultural relocated individuals were adequately absorbed by the main cities in Colombia (Bogota, Barranquilla, Cali, and Medellin) and therefore found themselves in very low productivity activities unemployed or unemployed disguise. This period is probably the beginning of an escalating Colombian population that began at a grander scale with the current unemployment cycle.

"A man of Principles"

“A Man of Principle” is an excellent movie representing Violence in Colombia starting in 1948. During this time, the liberals were in power, and the conservative followers were discriminated. This movie starts with a man called Leon Maria; he is conservative and lives in a small town called Tulua. Leon Maria is not so well economically; he has a cheese store and worked at a library. Many people in the town were liberals and went around discriminating against the conservative. The wealthiest, most powerful people there were liberals and had much influence in the government and in other political issues.

There is a turning point in the movie: Jorge Eliecer Gaitan, a very influential liberal leader killed by some conservatives. When this happens, the liberals decide to show how much they cared and started burning and destroying conservative symbols like the Catholic Church. This period of anger and violence was called ‘el bogotazo.’ Leon Maria does because he has to protect what he believes in and decides to get a conservative group to protect their church from the liberals. The next day Leon Maria was seen as a hero for his party; he stood up for what he believed no matter the cost.

The conservatives now had the power, and the government sent money to the party, and the party used the money to pay people to get rid of the liberals. Leon Maria receives a telegram informing him that he had an urgent meeting with the conservative leaders. In this reunion, the conservatives tell Leon Maria that he was the man chosen to protect its party, and they gave him guns and money to start right away. During the rest of the movie, they show how Leon Maria kills, threatens, and tortures liberals to leave their homes and go far away. This only lasts until the liberal party regains its power and Leon Maria is killed.

Throughout the movie, we can see how the political parties affect everyday life. It shows that the Violence in Colombia was mainly because of bipartisan conflicts that weren't really because of beliefs but instead inheritance. The real power in the town wasn't only wealth but also the amount of influence they had on the government and the amount of fear they provoked in the community. The name given to Leon Maria was the condor. This was because the people that killed liberals for the conservative party were called ‘pajaros’ or birds. A condor is a mighty and fearful bird, and this is what Leon Maria represented around the country, someone more powerful than just a simple bird.

Frente Nacional

With the military board (junta military) in the year 1958, the two political parties: liberals and conservatives, started the new era of peace and social development. Although everything was getting better, new problems started to come about, economically and socially. The liberals and conservatives were now sharing power equally, but it never came up to be a 50-50 percent equality throughout the country. As president for each party, the two years were named after FRENTE NACIONAL, which ended up with the violent movement.

From 1958 to 1970, industrialization became a backup for the new exportation methods, meaning the new government was more focused on developing new ideas to improve the economy.  In this period, the government was also able to enter more complex importation areas, creating changes in their new politics to increase their marketing development. A massive change also arises in the external national product, expanding and developing the modernized economy and reducing importations in a large percent.

As we have seen throughout the class, the industrial sector ruled for a long time leaving behind the agricultural sector. It wasn't until about 1955 that the government started to get focused on developing and growing this sector; to create new urban jobs the violent movement had to be exterminated by the Frente Nacional.  Simultaneously, new opportunities for the peasant were given, meaning the government gave them the chance to work on the territorial lands and see how significant a change it would make for the economy.

After spending and investing so much money in this new method, the government was undecided whether to move on with this idea or abandon it.  The big problem in this sector was that peasants did not have enough money to productively support the new economic development. It was also better to move on with new ideas due to the requirements presidents Lleras Restrepo proposed: 1) devalue the currency again, 2) import release, 3) free foreign exchange market.

References

Economic history of Colombia
Political history of Colombia